Cyperus gunnii is a species of sedge that is native to central and eastern parts of Australia.

See also 
 List of Cyperus species

References 

gunnii
Plants described in 1858
Flora of Queensland
Flora of New South Wales
Flora of Victoria (Australia)
Flora of South Australia
Flora of the Northern Territory
Taxa named by Joseph Dalton Hooker